Sotos is both a surname and a given name. Notable people with the name include: 

Jim Sotos, American film director 
Peter Sotos (born 1960), American writer and musician
Sotos Zackheos (born 1950/51), Cypriot diplomat